O'Ferrall may refer to:

Basil O'Ferrall CB, MA, an eminent Anglican priest in the second half of the 20th century
Charles Triplett O'Ferrall (1840–1905), Virginian politician who served as a U.S. Representative
Ernest O'Ferrall (1881–1925), popular Australian poet and short story writer
George More O'Ferrall (1907–1982), British film and television director
Philip Bourchier O'Ferrall, the current senior vice-president of Viacom International Media Networks
Rafael O'Ferrall (born 1954), United States Army officer, Deputy Commanding General for the Joint Task Force at Guantanamo Bay
Richard More O'Ferrall (1797–1880), Irish politician
Ronald O'Ferrall, the fourth Anglican Bishop of Madagascar from 1926 until 1940

See also
More O'Ferrall-Jencks plot, 2D plot of multiple reaction coordinate potential energy surfaces for chemical reactions involving simultaneous changes in two bonds
Ferrell
Ferrol (disambiguation)
Verrall